Melatonin receptor type 1A is a protein that in humans is encoded by the MTNR1A gene.

Function 

This gene encodes the MT1 protein, one of two high-affinity forms of a receptor for melatonin, the primary hormone secreted by the pineal gland. This receptor is a G protein-coupled, 7-transmembrane receptor that is responsible for melatonin effects on mammalian circadian rhythm and reproductive alterations affected by day length. The receptor is an integral membrane protein that is readily detectable and localized to two specific regions of the brain. The hypothalamic suprachiasmatic nucleus appears to be involved in circadian rhythm while the hypophysial pars tuberalis may be responsible for the reproductive effects of melatonin.

Ligands 

 Melatonin – full agonist 
 Afobazole – agonist
 Agomelatine – agonist

See also 
 Melatonin receptor
 Discovery and development of melatonin receptor agonists

References

Further reading 

 
 
 
 
 
 
 
 
 
 
 
 
 
 
 
 
 

G protein-coupled receptors
Human proteins
1A